Guangdong Loongon Animation & Culture Co., Ltd., often referred to as Loongon, is a Chinese children's toy manufacturer based in Guangdong and founded in 2003.  Loongon and its family of brands, including Lepin and Cogo are known for producing Lego-compatible brick sets.  Loongon is publicly listed as of 2014 as stock 831015 on the Chinese stock exchange known as the National Equities Exchange and Quotations.

Brands
The Loongon is the manufacturer and distributor of the following brands in North America and Europe:
 Loongon
 Kid's Dough
 Huimei Plastic Building Blocks

Lego-compatible:
 Cogo Plastic Building Blocks
 Lepin

Controversies and legal issues
Loongon was sued by Lego for the manufacturing and distribution of copied Lego IP. Lego won the lawsuit and working with the Chinese Police to track down any more counterfeit factories producing bricks. 

Lepin, a Loongon sub-brand, is accused by some Lego fan builders of taking their designs and creating commercial Lepin sets without permission.

See also
 Lego clone

References

External links
 Loongon Website (Chinese)

Construction toys
Companies listed on the National Equities Exchange and Quotations
Companies based in Guangdong